Jeremy Roger Horne (born October 25, 1986) is an American football wide receiver who is with the Calgary Stampeders. He was signed by the Kansas City Chiefs after going undrafted in the 2010 NFL Draft.  He played college football at Massachusetts after transferring from Syracuse after his freshman year.

College career
Horne attended Syracuse University his freshman year and played in seven games, primarily on special teams.  He transferred to UMass after his first season.  In three years at UMass, Horne recorded 85 catches for 1,343 yards and scored 11 touchdowns and also served as a kickoff returner.  He was named a third-team All-Colonial Athletic Conference Wide Receiver in his junior season.

Professional career

Kansas City Chiefs
Horne signed as a free agent with the Kansas City Chiefs after going undrafted in the 2010 NFL Draft.  He was on the Chiefs active roster for the first six games of the season making appearances in three of them.  He spent the last ten games of the year on the practice squad.  On January 11, 2011, Horne was signed by the Chiefs to a reserve/future deal. He was waived during final cuts during the 2011 season. After clearing waivers, he was signed to the Chiefs practice squad. On September 21, 2011, Horne was activated to the Chiefs active roster, taking Running Back Jamaal Charles's roster spot, after he was placed on injured reserve. He was waived on October 26, but was signed to the practice squad the following day. Horne was once again activated to the active roster on November 21. Horne finished the season with 5 rushing yards on 1 carry.

New York Giants
On May 12, 2013, Horne signed as a free agent with the New York Giants. On July 30, 2013, Horne was carted off the field with a foot injury. On August 1, 2013, Horne was waived/injured by the New York Giants. He cleared waivers and was placed on injured reserve. On August 7, 2013, Horne was released with an injury settlement.

External links
Kansas City Chiefs bio
UMass Minutemen bio

References

UMass Minutemen football players
Syracuse Orange football players
Kansas City Chiefs players
New York Giants players
American football wide receivers
Sportspeople from Albany, New York
Players of American football from New York (state)
Living people
1986 births